The Embassy of Egypt in London is the diplomatic mission of Egypt in the United Kingdom.

Egypt also maintains several other buildings in London: a consulate general at 2 Lowndes Street, Belgravia, a press and information Office at 299 Oxford Street, a cultural office at 4 Chesterfield Gardens, Mayfair and a medical office at 47 Longridge Road, Earl's Court.

There have been several protests outside the embassy in recent years: in 2011 during the protests against Hosni Mubarak, in 2013 following the violent clashes in Cairo between supporters and opponents of Mohammed Morsi and also in 2013 there was a protest against the rise of sexual attacks against women in Egypt.

Gallery

References

External links
Official site

Diplomatic missions in London
Diplomatic missions of Egypt
Egypt–United Kingdom relations
Buildings and structures in the Royal Borough of Kensington and Chelsea
Egypt